Wendy Zukerman is an Australian-American science journalist and podcaster. She is best known as the host of Science Vs, a program that dissects areas of scientific controversy and public confusion.

About 
Zukerman was born in the United States but raised in Melbourne, Australia. She attended Monash University and received a biomedical science and law degree. Her brother is actor Ashley Zukerman, and they were raised Jewish.

She has worked for the Australian Broadcasting Corporation (ABC) on the documentary television program, Catalyst, and the consumer affairs television program The Checkout. Additionally, she has written for many different publications including New Scientist magazine, Cosmos magazine, The Age, The Australian, and Saturday Paper.

In 2014 and 2015, she spoke at Storyology, an annual festival of journalism and media. In March 2018, she spoke at a SXSW, in a panel event called, "What Podcasts Ate for Dinner".

In 2021, Zukerman was amongst the first nominees of The Podcast Academy's new "Ambie" awards. She was one of seven nominees for the Best Host award.

Science Vs 
Since October 2015, her podcast Science Vs has been produced by Gimlet Media, a Brooklyn-based digital media company. The show was previously produced and distributed by the Australian Broadcasting Corporation (ABC) as part of ABC Radio's First Run podcast program. The podcast works on communicating science to non-scientists. The show takes a myth-busting approach, and topics on the show generally come from controversial topics or current events. Episode topics have included immigration, gun control, ghosts, climate change, acne, and antidepressants, among others. Zukerman has said that the idea for Science Vs came from news headlines about Gwyneth Paltrow wanting women to participate in a "health practice" of vaginal steaming, which she thought could combine science with humor. Zukerman summarized her podcast's position against false equivalences, saying, "If there's a 95 percent consensus among scientists, you report the consensus."

References

External links 

21st-century American journalists
21st-century Australian journalists
American emigrants to Australia
American women podcasters
American podcasters
Australian women podcasters
Australian podcasters
Australian women scientists
Jewish women scientists
Journalists from Melbourne
Living people
Monash University alumni
People from Melbourne
Science communicators
Year of birth missing (living people)
21st-century American women
Australian people of Peruvian descent
Australian people of Israeli descent
American people of Israeli descent
American people of Peruvian descent